Brittany Isenhour (born September 22, 1997) is an American professional soccer player who plays as a goalkeeper for Angel City FC of the National Women's Soccer League (NWSL).

Early life 
Isenhour grew up in Littleton, Colorado and started playing club soccer at the age of 12 with Real Colorado Foxes ECNL, helping the club reach the National Final in 2013 and 2014. Isenhour also played three years in the Colorado Olympic Development Program.

Denver Pioneers 
Isenhour played college soccer at the University of Denver between 2016 and 2019. In total, Isenhour played 80 career matches for Denver Pioneers, posting 25 career shutouts, the fourth most in program history. Isenhour won two Summit League Tournament titles in 2017 and 2018 as well as being recognized individually as Summit League Goalkeeper of the Year as a freshman in 2016. She was named to the Summit League Second Team in the other three seasons.

Club career

Colorado Rapids 
In 2019, Isenhour made 8 appearances for Colorado Rapids in the WPSL.

Orlando Pride 
Isenhour declared for the 2020 NWSL College Draft but was not selected. Originally trialing with Orlando Pride during preseason prior to the schedule disruption caused by the COVID-19 pandemic, she eventually signed a short-term contract with Orlando ahead of the 2020 NWSL Challenge Cup in July before the team was forced to withdraw. In September, Isenhour was signed through the 2021 season and made her debut on October 9 during the Fall Series, playing the full 90 minutes in a 2–1 defeat to Houston Dash. She made a total of five saves on her debut including one on Sophie Schmidt which was voted NWSL Save of the Week.

Angel City FC 
On December 17, 2021, Isenhour was traded along with a third-round pick in the 2023 NWSL Draft to new expansion franchise Angel City FC in exchange for a fourth-round pick in the 2023 NWSL Draft and an agreement regarding partial 2022 NWSL Expansion Draft protection. The previous day, Angel City had left the Pride roster alone during the expansion draft, only claiming the playing rights of Claire Emslie from Orlando.

International 
Isenhour has previously been called up to the United States national team at under-19 and under-20 level.

Personal life
She married Trystan Isenhour in December 2021.

Career statistics

Club 
.

Honors

College 
Summit League Tournament winner: 2017, 2018

Individual 
Summit League Goalkeeper of the Year: 2016

References

External links 
 Denver Pioneers profile
 NWSL profile
 

1997 births
Living people
American women's soccer players
Orlando Pride players
National Women's Soccer League players
Women's association football goalkeepers
Soccer players from Colorado
Sportspeople from Littleton, Colorado
Women's Premier Soccer League players
Denver Pioneers women's soccer players
Angel City FC players